Badartala is a neighbourhood of Kolkata city in West Bengal state of India. It is situated at the eastern bank of Hooghly River. Adjoined neighbourhoods are Rajabagan (east), Metiabruz (south east), Akra Phatak (south). Ayub Nagar Basti, Birjunala, Bagdipara, Jeliapara, Siraj Basti are some localities (bastis) of the neighbourhood.

Geography

Police district
Nadial police station is part of the Port division of Kolkata Police. It is located at 2-3/102 Dr. A.K.Road, Kolkata-700044.

Watgunge Women police station, located at 16, Watgunge Street, Kolkata-700023, covers all police districts under the jurisdiction of the Port division i.e. North Port, South Port, Watgunge, West Port, Garden Reach, Ekbalpur, Nadial, Rajabagan and Metiabruz.

Jadavpur, Thakurpukur, Behala, Purba Jadavpur, Tiljala, Regent Park, Metiabruz, Nadial and Kasba police stations were transferred from South 24 Parganas to Kolkata in 2011. Except Metiabruz, all the police stations were split into two. The new police stations are Parnasree, Haridevpur, Garfa, Patuli, Survey Park, Pragati Maidan, Bansdroni and Rajabagan.

Post office
Badartala post office is located near Badartala High School at Dr. Abdul Khabir road (Crossing railway line road).

Educational institutions

Badartala is slowly growing ahead in educational field. There is no college available for the matric passed students in their area. Students need to travel for college study. Some institutions are:
 Sahapur Sabitri Vidyalaya
 Badartala High School 
 Badartala Madhyak Balika Vidyalaya
 satghara high madrasa

Public transport
Transport is poor in the area. It is not connected well with other parts of the city by bus or any other type of transport. There is a private bus service no. 12 which goes to Esplanade via Metiabruz, Garden Reach, Kidderpore and Hastings.

Health and medical facilities
The area has a government hospital named Garden Reach State General Hospital with previously having  poor arrangement and facilities. The government haS taken certain measures and reconstructed the hospital in a large one with a good facilities. It shares its premises with the Nadial police station of the area.

Kolkata honour killing (2012)
On 7 December 2012, a man beheaded his younger sister in public, with a sword. He then walked to the Nadial police station with his sister's head and the sword. Scores of residents looked on in horror as he walked to a police station with the head in his left hand and the sword in his right, dripping blood all along the way. The police said the man asked to be charged and that he confessed to killing his sister for an extra-marital relationship.

References

Neighbourhoods in Kolkata